Desmia subdivisalis is a species of moth in the family Crambidae. It was described by Augustus Radcliffe Grote in 1871. It is found in the West Indies, Mexico and the United States, where it has been recorded from Florida to New Mexico, Illinois, Maryland and California.

The wingspan is about 19 mm. Adults are on wing from April to August.

References

Moths described in 1871
Desmia
Moths of North America